Pawnee County Courthouse in Pawnee City, Nebraska was built in 1911.  It was designed by architect William F. Gernandt in Classical Revival style.  It was listed on the National Register of Historic Places in 1990.

The third story is partly hidden behind a brick parapet; windows poke through the entablature;  the parapet and entablature are relatively unadorned.

Its more elaborate and prominent feature is a monumental four-column entry portico on its north, front facade.  The four columns have complex capitals, and there are squared pilasters behind the end columns.  The portico has a pair of stairways leading up to it, and a pediment above including figurative sculpture.  The pedimental sculpture is described in its 1989 NRHP nomination as "A rather delicate feature".  It is described as having:terra cotta allegorical figures and symbols located within the triangle of the pediment. Two bearded men in togas holding a shovel and a pitchfork are flanked by women with baskets of apples and other produce and symbolize agriculture and the fertility of the county.  The centered torch likely refers to the enduring nature of county government and democratic ideals.

See also

Pedimental sculptures in the United States

References

External links

Courthouses on the National Register of Historic Places in Nebraska
Buildings and structures in Pawnee County, Nebraska
Neoclassical architecture in Nebraska
Government buildings completed in 1911
County courthouses in Nebraska
1911 establishments in Nebraska
Historic districts on the National Register of Historic Places in Nebraska
National Register of Historic Places in Pawnee County, Nebraska